Darijus Džervus (born 20 July 1990) is a Lithuanian cyclist who last rode for .

Major results

2011
 10th Beverbeek Classic
2012
 1st  Time trial, National Under-23 Road Championships
2013
 9th Kampioenschap van Vlaanderen
2014
 2nd Road race, National Road Championships
2016
 1st Stage 2 Tour of Mersin
 5th Grand Prix Minsk
 7th Circuit d'Alger
 7th Minsk Cup
 9th Overall Baltic Chain Tour
 9th GP de la Ville d'Oran
 9th Memoriał Henryka Łasaka
2017
 National Road Championships
3rd Road race
5th Time trial
 8th Grand Prix Minsk
2018
 1st  Omnium, National Track Championships

References

1990 births
Living people
Lithuanian male cyclists